Charing Cross may refer to:

Charing Cross, New South Wales
Charing Cross (homestead) 
 Charing Cross, Bendigo, Victoria

Charing Cross, Ontario, in Chatham-Kent

Charing Cross, Lahore

England
 Charing Cross, London
 Charing Cross Road
 Charing Cross railway station 
 Charing Cross tube station
 Charing Cross Hospital

Scotland
 Charing Cross, Glasgow
 Charing Cross (Glasgow) railway station

See also 
 Charring Cross, Ooty, Tamil Nadu, India